Ernst Berger (born 15 February 1913, date of death unknown) was a Swiss skier. He competed in the Nordic combined event at the 1936 Winter Olympics.

References

External links
 

1913 births
Year of death missing
Swiss male Nordic combined skiers
Olympic Nordic combined skiers of Switzerland
Nordic combined skiers at the 1936 Winter Olympics
Place of birth missing